Crown Princess Sun of the Haeum Bong clan (Hangul: 순빈 봉씨, Hanja: 純嬪 奉氏; 1414 – ?) was the second wife Munjong of Joseon. Before her husband's accession to the throne, she was banished after it was discovered that she was sleeping with one of her handmaids.

Biography
Lady Bong became the Crown Princess (Hanja: 純嬪; Hangul: 순빈) in 1429, a few months after her predecessor, Crown Princess Hwi, was thrown out of the palace for witchcraft.

Apparently, Crown Prince Yi Hyang did not favor her, which made her incredibly angry. She reportedly took her husband's clothing and female clothing from the palace to send to her natal home, which breached etiquette.

When Consort Gwon became pregnant, Crown Princess Sun apparently complained to the palace women that she would be dismissed in favor of Lady Gwon, and she frequently cried. Her complaints became known throughout the palace and King Sejong scolded her that she should be happy that another concubine was pregnant when she was not. Sejong also scolded the Crown Prince that his concubine was pregnant but his official wife had no children, after which he spent more time with her.

Later, Crown Princess Sun reportedly became pregnant, but miscarried and buried the remains. However, when servants were sent to retrieve the child's remains, they found only empty burial clothes.

Demotion
The court records of 1436 note that Crown Princess Sun apparently also sent surplus food from palace meals to her natal home, spied on people outside of her palace through a gap in the wall of the servants' toilet, and received a visit from her aunt's husband after her father's death without notifying the Crown Prince, which, they said, showed a lack of regard for the general good.

She was also accused of being over intimate with So-ssang (소쌍), one of her maids and a member of the slave class. The two were described as inseparable and So-ssang reportedly slept with her mistress. When Crown Prince Hyang questioned why her maid slept with her, the consort responded that she loved him, but he didn't love her. So-ssang later told the court how the Crown Princess had invited her to lie down with her, whilst the other maids slept outside. Though So-ssang initially declined, the consort insisted, and So-ssang eventually undressed and went behind the screen where her mistress took off her remaining clothes and forced her to lie next to her 'as if with a man'. Crown Princess Sun then told the court that she was intimate with So-ssang night and day, as well as with another servant called Dan-ji (단지), because it solved the fact that she slept alone.

Upon hearing that his daughter-in-law had been intimate with a member of the nobi class, King Sejong consulted with various officials on demoting another of the Crown Prince's wives. The officials supported the motion to depose her, and Crown Princess Sun was demoted to commoner and banished. The decree for her dismissal, however, excluded any mention of her sleeping with her maid and focused instead on her sending palace supplies to her natal home and receiving visitors without her husband's knowledge.

Family 
 Grandfather 
 Bong Yu-rye (봉유례, 奉由禮)
 Father 
 Bong Ryeo (봉려, 奉礪) (1375 - 1436)
 Siblings 
 Younger brother – Bong Guk-hwa (봉극화, 奉克和)
 Younger brother – Bong Guk-yu (봉극유, 奉克柔)
 Husband 
 Yi Hyang, King Munjong (왕세자 향) (15 November 1414 - 1 June 1452) — No issue.
 Father-in-law – Yi Do, King Sejong the Great (조선 세종) (7 May 1397 - 30 March 1450)
 Mother-in-law – Queen Soheon of the Cheongsong Sim clan (소헌왕후 심씨) (12 October 1395 - 19 April 1446)

Popular culture
 Portrayed by Yeo Min-joo in the 2008 KBS2 TV series The Great King, Sejong
 Portrayed By Jung Daeun (정다은) in the KBS 2021 Drama Special- Episode 3: The Palace.

References

Notes

Works cited

15th-century Korean people
1414 births
Year of death unknown
Royal consorts of the Joseon dynasty
Medieval LGBT people
LGBT royalty
LGBT nobility
Korean LGBT people
15th-century Korean women